While passenger trains are operated by private operators, motive power is generally provided by the Islamic Republic of Iran Railways (RAI). Additionally, Alborz Niroo Equipment & Railway Fleet Company runs freight train using privately owned diesel locomotives.

Current

Electric locomotives

Diesel locomotives

This is an incomplete list of diesel locomotives used in Iran.

Electric multiple unit

High-speed trains

Diesel multiple unit

Carriages

Former

Steam locomotives
Steam locomotives have been phased out by Iran Railways.

References 

Sources: from World's Main locomotives and railfaneurope and traction dep. of RAI.

Rolling stock of Iran